Harry Davy (1872 – after 1896) was an English professional footballer. A right back, he played in the Football League for Leicester Fosse.

References

1872 births
Year of death missing
People from Padiham
English footballers
Association football fullbacks
Padiham F.C. players
Heywood Central F.C. players
Blackpool F.C. players
Leicester City F.C. players
Bristol City F.C. players
English Football League players